Marlow Theatre may refer to:

Marlow Theatre, Bridport, Dorset, England
Marlow Theatre (Ironton, Ohio), on the National Register of Historic Places listings in Lawrence County, Ohio
Marlow Theatre, Helen Historic District, Montana, United States

See also
Marlowe Theatre, a 1,200-seat theatre in Canterbury, England